{{DISPLAYTITLE:C16H19N}}
The molecular formula C16H19N (molar mass: 225.33 g/mol, exact mass: 225.1517 u) may refer to:

 Ephenidine
 Lefetamine
 β-Phenylmethamphetamine (N,α-dimethyl-β-phenyl-phenethylamine)

Molecular formulas